Daddy is a Pakistani drama serial which premiered on ARY Digital on 13 November 2010 and ended on 5 February in the following year. The serial is produced by Samina Humayun Saeed's Production house Six Sigma Productions, written by Ali Imran, directed by Misbah Khalid.

This was veteran actor Khayyam Sarhadi's last drama serial.  He died before the last episode was aired, which was officially dedicated to the deceased actor.

Cast and characters

Main cast
 Sajid Hasan as Jahanzaib
 Samiya Mumtaz as Anya
 Aimen Khan as Haiya
 Zeeshan Shah as Hassam
 Sardar Nadir as Bilal

Supporting cast
 Khayyam Sarhadi as Jahangir
 Zainab Qayyum as Maria
 Humayun Saeed as Sameer
 Sajjad Kishwar as Anya's father
 Parveen Malik as Anya's mother
 Aneesa Sheikh as Saima
 Niggi as Saima's mother

Notable guest stars
 Shamoon Abbasi as Walid

Plot
Jehanzeb (Sajid Hasan) portrays the role of an ever-loving and ever-compromising Daddy, who has been there for his children, when Anya (Samia Mumtaz) left them for her self-progression. It all starts when Jehanzeb and Anya, who have been great friends since their days at art school, realise their feelings for each other and decide to get married. Anya has always been passionate for Filmmaking and aspires to be a film director, but till now she had been suppressing her passions for the sake of her husband and 3 kids. However, one day she gets an opportunity to do a short course of 6 months from a film institute in India. Jehanzeb and his father, Jahangir (Khayyam Sarhadi) are supportive in the decision of taking up this opportunity and ultimately Anya leaves her children with Jehanzeb. After completing the course, Anya gets her first professional offer and this time she is not willing to go back home, which affects her children negatively throughout the series. Facing this kind of negligence at such a pivotal point of time, Jehanzeb decides to play the role of both the parents along with the help of his old friend Maria (Zainab Qayyum). And when Anya returns to Pakistan after a long time, she remains astound to find that her children absolutely belong to their ‘Daddy’.

References

2010 Pakistani television series debuts
2011 Pakistani television series endings
Pakistani drama television series
Urdu-language television shows
Television shows set in Islamabad
ARY Digital original programming